The Nepal national baseball team is a national team of Nepal and in the sport of Baseball. They made their debut in the 2017 West Asian Baseball Cup.

History 
Baseball in Nepal was introduced around the 1980s by a group of youth returned from the United States. The development of baseball started back in 1999 supported by NPO Japan Club Laligurans.

After the establishment of Nepal Baseball & Softball Association (NBSA), it started to work for the development and promotion of the game. Nepal national baseball team earn maiden international victory against Iraq in the 13th BFA Asia Baseball Championship in 2017.

References 

Baseball in Asia
Baseball
1980s establishments in Nepal